Brkhera Basantpur urf Dayanathpur Village is near a distance of  from the national capital, New Delhi and 370 km north-west of the state capital Lucknow.

History
Brkherabasantpur urf Dayanathpur was established in 1950 it was captured by Dayanathpur.

Demographics

According to the 2011 census Village Brkherabasantpur Urf Dayanathpur in Moradabad district has a population of 2300, roughly equal to the nation of Moradabad or the India state of Uttar Pradesh. This gives it a ranking of 26th in India (out of a total of 640). Its population growth rate over the decade 2001-2011 was  25.25%.	
In 2011 a new district named Sambhal district is formed with two sub districts of Moradabad district.
The rest of Moradabad district have a population of 3126507.The Muslim population in rest of Moradabad district is 1588297. 
Moradabad	has a sex ratio of 	903	females for every 1000 males, and a literacy rate of 58.67%.

Education
Schools in Brkhera Basantpur urf Dayanathpur Village, whether using English or Hindi as a medium of instruction, are affiliated to either of the four bodies, Central Board of Secondary Education (C.B.S.E.), Council for the Indian School Certificate Examinations (C.I.S.C.E), University of Cambridge International Examinations and Uttar Pradesh Madhyamik Shiksha Parishad (U.P. Board).

Religions in Brkhera Basantpur urf Dayanathpur Village 
 Muslim Kbrishtan Near Talab in Dayanathpur.
 Balmiki Shamshan Ghaat Between kokarpur to Dayanathpur Road.
 Hindusum Chmenda Near Naher in Dayanathpur.

References

1950 establishments in Uttar Pradesh
Villages in Moradabad district